Deirdre Murphy may refer to:

 Deirdre Murphy (cyclist) (1959 – 2014), Olympic cyclist
 Deirdre Murphy (judge) (born 1953), Irish judge